Bathurst Daingerfield Peachy II, sometimes misspelled as "Dangerfield" (July 5, 1893 – April 29, 1953) was the head baseball coach for William & Mary College for just the 1918 season. The Indians, as they were then known, compiled a 5–7 record that year. He graduated from William & Mary in 1914 and was a member of the Flat Hat Club while attending. "Peachy" as he was nicknamed also played four years as a left fielder for the baseball team, winning a championship in 1911 and serving as team captain in 1914.

His father, Bathurst Peachy, was a lawyer in Williamsburg and owned The Millinery Company, a fine goods store.

References

1893 births
1953 deaths
Baseball outfielders
Baseball players from Virginia
William & Mary Tribe baseball coaches
William & Mary Tribe baseball players
Sportspeople from Williamsburg, Virginia